The Platform Adaptive Trial of Novel Antivirals for Early Treatment of COVID-19 in the Community (PANORAMIC Trial) is a clinical trial in the United Kingdom to test the effectiveness of new antiviral drugs at the early stages of COVID-19 infections. The study aims to find out if antivirals can prevent the need for hospitalisation and help faster recovery for people aged over 50 and those at higher risk due to underlying health conditions. PANORAMIC is sponsored by the University of Oxford and funded by the National Institute for Health and Care Research (NIHR). The trial was launched in December 2021, and as of June 2022, over 25,000 people are enrolled as participants.

Overview 
PANORAMIC is a platform trial that will compare two groups who are having symptoms of COVID: one will receive standard NHS care and the other one will receive standard NHS care plus antiviral treatment. Participants can take part from home online or via phone and the antivirals are delivered to them.

Participants 
People can enroll in the study if they had symptoms of COVID (confirmed by a test) less than 5 days prior to enrolling. They have to be either aged 50 or over, or have a preexisting health condition.

Treatments 
The antivirals tested in the study will be molnupiravir and nirmatrelvir/ritonavir (Paxlovid).

Results

Molnupiravir 
In December 2022, results from the trial showed that for higher risk, vaccinated adults molnupiravir does not reduce the chances of hospitalisation and death. However it leads to faster recovery and reduced viral load.

See also 
 COVID-19 drug development
 RECOVERY Trial
 Solidarity trial

References

External links 
 

Clinical trials
COVID-19 pandemic in the United Kingdom
Medical responses to the COVID-19 pandemic
United Kingdom responses to the COVID-19 pandemic